Project Space Planes is an advertising campaign devised by the people at Samsung. It was designed to advertise their SD Memory card.

Overview
The Idea was to take hundreds of paper aeroplanes all with SD cards attached and dangle them underneath a helium weather balloon this balloon would then travel all the way to the edge of space before releasing the paper planes to fall back down to earth. Each memory card would contain a personal message to the person who found it. The people who find these SD cards will then hopefully message back the Project Space Planes team so they could see how fair there paper planes had travelled. The point of this exercise is to prove how tough these SD cards are.

Launch
The launch was delayed multiple times due to weather issues but finally took place from a barn in Wolfsburg in Germany. 200 paper plans were launched from a balloon filled with 7,815 litres of helium gas, reached 37,339 metres (122,503 feet) before it burst and fell back down to earth. It took about 2.6 hours to rise up to this height and then only 40 minutes to fall back down and land.
The payload travelled over 300 kilometres from the launch site near Wolfsburg and landed just north of Schonwald, narrowly dodging a lake, a river and a military base.
(you can watch the YouTube video of the link here)
https://www.youtube.com/watch?v=ApM4BGG8r40

Results
If you discover one of the SD cards contact the team at http://projectspaceplanes.com/ask.

References
https://www.youtube.com/watch?v=K6neVbsD1FQ
http://projectspaceplanes.com/

Samsung